The 1999 Wismilak International singles was the singles event of the fifth edition of the most prestigious women's tennis tournament held in Southeast Asia. It was not played the previous year, so there was no defending champion.

Swede Åsa Carlsson won in the final, 6–2, 6–4, against Erika deLone, to win her first WTA title.

Seeds

Draw

Finals

Top half

Bottom half

Qualifying

Seeds

Qualifiers

Qualifying draw

First qualifier

Second qualifier

Third qualifier

Fourth qualifier

References
 ITF singles results page

Singles
Wismilak International - Singles